Anthony Cosmo (born October 6, 1977) is a former professional lacrosse goaltender in the National Lacrosse League. Cosmo is a three-time NLL All-Star, and was named NLL Goaltender of the Year in 2007. Cosmo also plays for the Brampton Excelsiors (MSL) Major Series Lacrosse Senior A Men's league.

Cosmo began his lacrosse career with the Junior A Mississauga Tomahawks of the Ontario Lacrosse Association. He then went on to play for the Burnaby Lakers of the BC Junior A Lacrosse League. In 1998, playing with fellow stars Cam Sedgwick and Kaleb Toth, Cosmo and the Lakers won the Minto Cup.

Cosmo then went on to play for the Victoria Shamrocks of the Western Lacrosse Association. On September 16, 2005, the Shamrocks won their eighth Mann Cup, and he was named the series' Most Valuable Player.

National Lacrosse League career
In 2001, he made his NLL debut with the Toronto Rock, where he played for four seasons as a backup goaltender. On July 27, 2004, Cosmo was traded to San Jose in a six-player blockbuster trade.  He continued to succeed as a starter for the Stealth, and was selected as the starting goaltender for the Western Division in both the 2005 and 2006 National Lacrosse League All-Star Game.

In 2009 Cosmo finished fifth in the league with a 12.28 goals against average (GAA). During 2006, Cosmo's 10.38 GAA was the third best in the league, and his save percentage was sixth best in the league. 2007 was Cosmo's best career season, leading the league in both GAA (10.22) and save percentage (.792). For his performance, Cosmo was named the Progressive Goaltender of the Year award for the 2007 season.

Cosmo was traded to the Chicago Shamrox for Matt Roik and two first-round draft picks. However, shortly before the 2009 season began, the Shamrox suspended operations, and a dispersal draft was held. Cosmo was selected first overall by the expansion Boston Blazers. During the 2009 NLL season, he was named a reserve to the All-Star game.

After three seasons, the Boston Blazers announced that they would not be participating in the 2012 NLL season, and a dispersal draft was held. Cosmo was selected third overall by the Minnesota Swarm. Cosmo never reported to the Swarm, and five games into the 2012 season he was traded to the Buffalo Bandits for two first-round draft picks.

Statistics

NLL
Reference:

Awards

References

External links 
Anthony Cosmo at the Victoria Shamrocks Official Website

1977 births
Living people
Boston Blazers players
Buffalo Bandits players
Canadian expatriate lacrosse people in the United States
Canadian lacrosse players
Lacrosse goaltenders
Lacrosse people from Ontario
National Lacrosse League All-Stars
National Lacrosse League major award winners
San Jose Stealth players
Sportspeople from Mississauga
Toronto Rock players